The 2014–15 Sydney Sixers season was the club's fourth consecutive season in the Big Bash League (BBL).

Sydney Sixers came fourth overall after the regular season, qualifying for the finals series. The club reached the final at Manuka Oval in Canberra, but was defeated by 4 wickets on the last ball of the match by Perth Scorchers. The final was also the last match of Brett Lee's career as a cricketer.

Players

Squad
Players with international caps are listed in bold.

Transfers

In:

Out:

Champions League Twenty20
As the Sydney Sixers lost in the semi-finals to the Perth Scorchers, they did not qualify for the 2014 Champions League Twenty20 tournament.

Big Bash League

Ladder

Matches
Times shown are in Australian Western Standard Time (UTC+08) for Perth, Australian Central Daylight Time (UTC+10:30) for Adelaide, Australian Eastern Standard Time (UTC+10:00) for Brisbane and Australian Eastern Daylight Time (UTC+11:00) for all remaining venues.

Finals
The top four teams from the group stage qualified for the semi finals.

Playoff tree
{{4TeamBracket
|RD2=Final

|score-width=100
|team-width=
|seed-width=

|RD1-seed1= 4
|RD1-team1= Sydney Sixers
|RD1-score1= 4/181 (20 ov)
|RD1-seed2=1
|RD1-team2= Adelaide Strikers (H)
|RD1-score2= 94 (14.3 ov)

|RD1-seed3=2|RD1-team3= Perth Scorchers (H)|RD1-score3= 7/144 (20 ov)
|RD1-seed4=3
|RD1-team4= Melbourne Stars
|RD1-score4=126 (19.5 ov)

|RD2-seed1=4
|RD2-team1= Sydney Sixers
|RD2-score1= 5/147 (20 ov)
|RD2-seed2=2
|RD2-team2= Perth Scorchers
|RD2-score2='6/148 (20 ov)
}}

Matches

Player StatisticsStatistics include all finals gamesKey: Hover over heading for tooltips''

Source: Cricinfo

Popularity
The 2014-15 Big Bash League season saw a significant increase in crowds as well as TV viewership on Network Ten for the Sydney Sixers matches. Major statistics for the season were as follows:
 Total Sixers membership tally was 1915, an increase of 25% compared to 2013-14 season.
 The crowd of 36,487 for the derby match against Sydney Thunder on January 22, 2015, was the highest ever in NSW domestic cricket history beating the previous record crowd of 32,823 set earlier in the season between the same teams.
 Average home crowd of 24,023, an increase of 22% compared to 2013-14 season.
 The Sixers matches during the Big Bash League had an average viewership of 1,000,072 for each game on TV. These are the highest average ratings for any sports club which is based in Sydney.

References

External links
Official site

Sydney Sixers seasons